Pawns & Kings is the seventh studio album by American rock band Alter Bridge and the follow-up to 2019's Walk the Sky. It was  released on October 14, 2022, via Napalm Records.

Background
In September 2021, guitarist Mark Tremonti revealed that he and Alter Bridge would be recording their seventh studio album during the spring of 2022, with a tentative release date some time in the fall. Tremonti and Myles Kennedy subsequently began pre-production on the album in January 2022, with recording taking place during the April with Michael "Elvis" Baskette once again as producer after producing the previous five Alter Bridge albums. During a radio interview in the May, Tremonti revealed that the album would be entitled Pawns & Kings and would be released on October 14. In a subsequent interview, he explained how Baskette was "absolutely in love with the record" but that Tremonti and Kennedy's stylistic preferences over time had changed so much that he could not recognise which member of the band was responsible for which music.

The album was officially revealed, including its artwork and tracklist, on July 18. The cover shows a bridge with the date the band was formed on the left side of the bridge and the release date of the album on the right. The lead single, "Pawns & Kings", was released on streaming platforms with an accompanying lyric video on social media. The album is the shortest album in the band's discography to date, while at the same time featuring their longest piece to date.

Track listing

Personnel
Alter Bridge
Myles Kennedy – lead vocals, rhythm and lead guitar, programming
Mark Tremonti – lead and rhythm guitar, backing vocals, lead vocals on “Stay”
Brian Marshall – bass guitar
Scott Phillips – drums, percussion

Production
Michael Baskette – producer, mixer, programming
Jef Moll – digital editing
Josh Saldate - assistant engineering
Brad Blackwood – mastering

Charts

References

2022 albums
Alter Bridge albums
Napalm Records albums
Albums produced by Michael Baskette